Buszyce may refer to:

 Buszyce, Masovian Voivodeship
 Buszyce, Opole Voivodeship